Premnoplex is the genus of typical barbtails, birds in the family Furnariidae. It contains the following species:

 Spotted barbtail, Premnoplex brunnescens
 White-throated barbtail, Premnoplex tatei

The name Premnoplex comes from the Greek words premnon, meaning "tree trunk" and ples, meaning "to strike".

References

 
Bird genera
Taxa named by George Kruck Cherrie
Taxonomy articles created by Polbot